Balogun Afolabi Oluwaseyi, known professionally as Seyi Vibez, is a Nigerian singer and songwriter. He is known for his breakthrough single "Chance (Ham)" from his second studio album Billion Dollar Baby which debuted at No. 19 on the UK Afrobeats singles chart and peaked number 7 on the TurnTable Top 100 chart.

Early life and career 
Born in Ketu, Lagos State and grew up in Ikorodu, Seyi Vibez debuted in 2019 with his single "Anybody". He first gained popularity in 2021 following the release of his single "Godsent", same year he released his debut studio album No Seyi No Vibez (NSNV), his second studio album Billion Dollar Baby with the Mixtape "Billion Dollar Baby 2.0" was released in 2022, the album peaked number 1 on the Turntable 50 albums chart. Same year he was cited as one of the 16 African artistes to watch by MoreBranches.

On 6 January 2023, Seyi Vibez released his 5 tracked debut Extended play, "Memory Card", with guest feature from American rapper YXNG K.A. First week of launching the Ep, it garnered over 6.30 million streams with four track from the Ep dominating the Turntable top 10 chart and was listed by Pan African Music as one of the 10 best albums of January 2023.

On 9 January 2023, Seyi Vibez performed at the nearly launched festival "BWUSFEST" alongside Black Sheriff and Asake. On February 2, 2023, "Let There Be Light" by fellow Nigerian star Zlatan featuring Seyi Vibez was released. The song debuted at No. 14 on Apple Music top 100 Nigeria chart.

Critical reception 
Okay Africa listed "Alaska" a single from his debut extended play as one of the best songs in Nigeria.

References

External links 

 Seyi Vibez at AllMusic

Living people
Nigerian singer-songwriters
Year of birth missing (living people)